Sabz Pushan may refer to:
 Sabz Pushan, Kerman
 Sabz Pushan, Sistan and Baluchestan